The Honda Prize is awarded by the Honda Foundation. It is awarded for "the efforts of an individual or group who contribute new ideas which may lead the next generation in the field of ecotechnology". It is sometimes referred to as the "Nobel Prize in Technology" since it has put a spotlight on achievements in a variety of fields based on a wide perspective in the future, including two Turing-awarded artificial intelligence accomplishments.

Prize 
The prize consists of a diploma, medal, and a reward of 10 million yen.

List of recipients

References 

Science and technology awards